Conwy (Conway prior to 1983) was an electoral constituency represented in the House of Commons of the Parliament of the United Kingdom. It returned one Member of Parliament (MP) by the single-member district plurality (also known as first-past-the-post) system of voting.

The constituency was created for the 1950 general election, and abolished for the 2010 general election.

History
It was a marginal between the Conservative Party and the Labour Party throughout its existence.

The Conwy Welsh Assembly constituency was created with the same boundaries as the Conwy House of Commons constituency in 1999.

Boundaries 
The constituency was, geographically, relatively small for its region, as it followed and tended to keep to the coast, taking in parts of two separate densely populated coastal conurbations.

As well as the walled castle town of Conwy from which it bore its name, the constituency mainly comprised the popular holiday resort and retail centre of Llandudno to the east, and the city of Bangor, which is home to the University of Wales, Bangor, to the west.  It also included the smaller coastal towns of Penmaenmawr and Llanfairfechan, as well as some sparser inland areas including former slate-quarrying communities in the Ogwen Valley.

The constituency, notably, did not include Colwyn Bay (or outlying Rhos-on-Sea), which forms part of a coastal conurbation (and the Conwy county borough) with Llandudno and its outlying town of Penrhyn Bay—both in the constituency; this area comes under the constituency of Clwyd West to the east.  Nor did it include the town of Caernarfon—just southwest of Bangor—which was in a constituency of the same name.

The constituency was also bordered by Meirionnydd Nant Conwy to the south, and the insular constituency of Ynys Mon to the west.

Following the decisions of the Welsh Boundary Commission, the Conwy seat was significantly altered, forming the base of a new Aberconwy constituency established for the 2010 general election. Part of the constituency (notably Bangor) became part of the new Arfon constituency.

Profile
Although the constituency included a student population from the university, most of the voters were towards the older end of the age spectrum as it was a popular retirement area.  The constituency was also linguistically diverse, with mainly English speakers in the east and mainly Welsh speakers in the west and inland areas.

Members of Parliament 

The last MP was Betty Williams of the Labour Party, who held the seat from 1997 (when she gained 35.04% of the vote—a 9.4% swing from the Conservatives) until its abolition in 2010.  Williams increased her share of the vote in 2001 (by 6.8%), but it was reduced in 2005 (by 4.7%).  She is also the first female MP to hold the seat. The seat was previously held (since its renaming in 1983) by Sir Wyn Roberts for the Conservative Party, who was first elected for Conway, the old anglicised name of the constituency, in 1970.

Elections

Elections in the 1950s

Elections in the 1960s

Elections in the 1970s

Elections in the 1980s

Elections in the 1990s

Elections in the 2000s

In the 2005 general election, the seat was the 81st easiest seat for the Liberal Democrats to gain, and the 153rd easiest seat for the Conservative Party to gain. The Labour Party did not include the seat on its list of vulnerable seats and eventually held the seat (with a reduced proportion of the vote).

Official declaration of result of the poll (in PDF)

See also 
 List of parliamentary constituencies in Clwyd
 List of parliamentary constituencies in Gwynedd

References

Historic parliamentary constituencies in North Wales
Constituencies of the Parliament of the United Kingdom established in 1950
Constituencies of the Parliament of the United Kingdom disestablished in 2010